The Stromboli class is a series of two replenishment oilers used by the Marina Militare since 1975. They are to be replaced by the Vulcano class beginning in 2019.

The ships are capable of loading:
 of NATO F76 diesel fuel
 of NATO F44/JP5 aviation fuel
 of solid goods

Ships

References

External links

Stromboli (A 5327) Marina Militare website
Vesuvio (A 5329) Marina Militare website

Ships built by Cantieri Navali del Tirreno e Riuniti
Auxiliary ships of the Italian Navy
Auxiliary replenishment ship classes